The West Lolo Complex is a large wildfire complex currently burning near Plains, Montana. The fires started on July 8 by lightning. Started by lightning strikes, the fires have collectively burned  and is 15% percent contained as of August 5, 2021.

Events

July 
The West Lolo Complex was first reported on July 8, 2021 at around 11:10 am MST.

August

Containment 
As of August 20, 2021 the fire is 15% contained.

Current closures

Closures

Impact

Evacuations

References

External links 

2021 Montana wildfires
July 2021 events in the United States
August 2021 events in the United States
Wildfires in Montana